The Mosman Preparatory School, officially the Mosman Church of England Preparatory School and commonly abbreviated as Mosman Prep, is a dual-campus independent Anglican single-sex primary day school for boys, located on the Lower North Shore and the Northern Beaches of Sydney, New South Wales, Australia. The school was established in 1904 and is based on the UK preparatory school system.

History 
Mosman Preparatory School was founded in 1904 by A. H. "Tibby" Yarnold, who aimed to create a school to which parents could "confidently send their boys". The school started with 26 boys with ages ranging from 9–14 and numbers grew but then dropped during the Great Depression, after which numbers steadily started to rise once more. There are now more than 300 boys attending the school, with the range of years being from Kindergarten to Year 6. The school opened its outdoor educational campus  in Terry Hills. Nowadays the school aims to provide a social and sporting as well as academic education.

Houses 
The school's three houses were named after three previous headmasters of the school. Houses were introduced to the school in Mr. Begbie's time as headmaster.

  Yarnold 
  MacDougall 
  Bradley

Campuses 
The School has two campuses, the main school in the suburb of Mosman and its outdoor educational campus located in Terrey Hills, it was designed to teach students about the outdoors, to have a change in the learning environment from in a classroom to an open area and to be used as a sporting facility for weekend sport and training.

Headmasters 
The following individuals have served as Headmaster of Mosman Prep:

See also 

 List of Anglican schools in New South Wales
 Anglican education in Australia

References

External links 
 

Boys' schools in New South Wales
Preparatory schools (Commonwealth)
Educational institutions established in 1904
1904 establishments in Australia
Mosman, New South Wales
Anglican Diocese of Sydney
Anglican primary schools in Sydney